Auxon is a commune in the Aube département in the Grand Est region of north-eastern France.

The inhabitants of the commune are known as Alsoniens or Alsoniennes.

The commune has been awarded three flowers by the National Council of Towns and Villages in Bloom in the Competition of cities and villages in Bloom.

Geography
Access to the commune is by Route nationale N77 from Villeneuve-au-Chemin in the west which passes just to the north of the village and continues north-east to Villery. The D374 comes from Maraye-en-Othe in the north, passes through the village, and continues to Ervy-le-Châtel in the south. The D1 road goes east from the D374 to Montigny-les-Monts. Apart from the village there are the hamlets of Sivrey, Vert, Courtelon, Roncenay, Les Croisettes, and La Coudre. The commune is mixed forest and farmland with especially large forests in the north.

The Armance forms the southern border of the commune as it flows west becoming the Armançon then following the Canal de Bourgogne to join the Yonne at Migennes. The Saussol flows south down the western side of the commune to join the Armance east of Ervy-le-Châtel. The Ru de Sivrey rises near Sivrey and flows south to join the Saussol as does the Ru d'Auxon which rises near the village. The Ru de Vert rises near Vert and also flows south to join the Saussol. The Ruisseau de Montigny flows across the south of the commune from north-east to south-west and joins the Armance on the southern border of the commune.

Neighbouring communes and villages

History
In 1846 the commune of Eaux-Puiseaux was created from the territory of the commune of Auxon.

Heraldry

Administration

List of Successive Mayors

Demography
In 2017 the commune had 1,005 inhabitants.

Culture and heritage

Religious heritage

The commune has one religious building that is registered as an historical monument:
The Parish Church of Saint-Loup-de-Sens (16th century). The church was once in the Diocese of Sens (Yonne) and the seat of a priest conferred by the abbot of Saint-Pierre-le-Vif-lès-Sens. Started on the eastern side in 1506, it was completed by 1550. The South portal was complete in 1537 and the west portal in 1540. The western arches and the tower were built in the 17th century. The Church contains a very large  number of items that are registered as historical objects.
The Chapel of Notre-Dame de la Coudre contains several items that are registered as historical objects:
A Processional Cross (12th century)
A Statue: Virgin and Child (disappeared) (14th century)
A Bronze Bell (disappeared) (1563)
The Furniture in the Chapel
 The Hamlet of Sivrey: its chapel and its Lavoir

Notable people linked to the commune
Georges Alexis Mocquery (1772-1847), General in the Army of the Republic and the Empire, born at Auxon and died at Tours.
Parfait Jans, politician and writer, died on 24 August 2011 at Auxon.

See also
Communes of the Aube department

Bibliography
Charles Fichot, Monumental Statistics of Aube department, Vol. II., Paris. 1888, reprinted by Sancey, Saint-Julien-les-Villas, 1980, p. 9 & 10 (dedicated to the church, the statuettes of the Retable from the old main altar by the sculptor from Troyes François Joseph Valtat).

References

External links

Auxon Official website 
Auxon on the old IGN website 
Auxon on the 1750 Cassini Map

Communes of Aube